Bəhramtəpə (also, Bəhrəmtəpə, Agakhanly, Pervomayskoye, and Pervoye Maya; ; formerly Bir May) is a village and municipality in the Imishli Rayon of Azerbaijan.  It has a population of 4,089. 

During the Soviet era, the village was known as Bir May (meaning May 1), in honour of the Soviet Labor Day.  The village was renamed Bəhramtəpə in 1992.

References 

 

Populated places in Imishli District